The Club is a 2021 Turkish period drama streaming television series directed by Seren Yüce and Zeynep Günay Tan and starring Gökçe Bahadır, Barış Arduç, Salih Bademci, Fırat Tanış, Metin Akdülger and Asude Kalebek. The show was released on Netflix on 5 November 2021, with season one consisting of 10 episodes, divided into two parts of 6 and 4 episodes respectively. Part 2 premiered on 6 January 2022.

Premise 
Matilda, an ex-convict, works in one of the most prominent nightclubs of Istanbul in 1955. Trying to establish a good relationship with her daughter, Matilda struggles to keep her daughter Raşel away from Pera's troublemaker, Fıstık İsmet. Matilda also tries to stand against her boss Orhan, nightclub manager Çelebi and artist Selim.

Plot 
In 1950s Istanbul, Matilda is released from prison as part of a general amnesty after serving time for murder. A Sephardic Jew, she applies at the local community center for travel papers for her to make aliyah to Israel when the rabbi informs her about her daughter, Raşel, who was taken away from her as an infant and is now a delinquent jailed for breaking into a nightclub managed by Çelebi. Matilda is initially reluctant to have anything to do with her daughter but changes her mind, but at the prison, she is spotted by Çelebi, who from being willing not to press charges suddenly demands that Matilda work for her in the club, located in the Pera district. Raşel is initially hostile to Matilda, but opens up when her mother explains her past. 

During the Second World War, Matilda belonged to a prominent business-minded family that was targeted by a discriminatory tax by ultranationalist Turks. Matilda had fallen in love with a Muslim employee who later betrayed the location of their savings, leading to the arrest of Matilda's brother and father, who later died in a labor camp. In revenge, Matilda shot her boyfriend and was imprisoned, but not before realizing that she was pregnant. Angry at her daughter's father, she chose to give up Raşel to the care of the local Jewish orphanage. Matilda eventually realizes that she had met Çelebi before her imprisonment, and after confronting him, he admits that he was one of the family's servants who tried to warn them about her boyfriend's betrayal, only to be framed for theft and fired. Eventually, tensions between Matilda and Çelebi escalate until the former chooses to stand up on behalf of her colleagues and demand better treatment from the club's owner, Orhan. Orhan agrees to split management of the Club, with Çelebi managing the stage and Matilda taking care of the backstage and the star singer, Selim Songür. 

Raşel strikes up a relationship with a Muslim taxi driver named İsmet, the estranged son of local gangster Ali, and is later impregnated by him. Their relationship strains that between Raşel and Matilda, who opposes it, and after an argument Raşel moves out of Matilda's place to get married with İsmet. Meanwhile, Matilda realizes that Kürşat, Orhan's new business associate, was the same ultranationalist who persecuted her family, prompting her to warn Çelebi and Orhan. After another argument with Çelebi over how he has been treating her, he opens up saying that his decision to employ her in the club was a part of his unrequited and unnoticed feelings for her before she was imprisoned, and that he also recognizes Kürşat from before. It is later revealed that Kürşat has been scheming to seize control and Turkify the club after finding out that Orhan is actually an ethnic Greek, just like what he did with Matilda's family business. 

Kürşat, with the help of Ali and his thugs instigate the Istanbul pogrom, destroying non-Turkish stores and attacking minorities they can find. During the riots, Kürşat discovers Orhan's mother Mevhibe, who is hidden by Orhan after she experiences flashbacks from the Burning of Smyrna and starts speaking Greek in fits of dementia. After a struggle, Kürşat overpowers Orhan and prepares to kill him after telling him of his plans, but is bludgeoned to death by Mevhibe. As flames from the riots engulf their quarters, Orhan strangles Mevhibe as an act of mercy. Outside, Raşel is caught up in the violence as İsmet, who tries to save her, is mauled by Ali's thugs to the latter's approval. She is rescued by Matilda just as her water breaks but is barred from entering the club, along with other refugees by a fearful doorkeeper. Çelebi, realizing the danger knocks down the gatekeeper and rescues Matilda and her group, helping Raşel give birth and redeeming himself to Matilda.

Episodes

Cast and characters 

 Gökçe Bahadır as Matilda Aseo, a Sephardi Jew and ex-convict working in a prominent nightclub of Istanbul.
 Barış Arduç as "Fıstık" İsmet Denizer, a taxi driver and Raşel's love interest.
 Asude Kalebek as Raşel Aseo, Matilda's daughter and İsmet's love interest.
 Salih Bademci as Selim Songür, the singer of the nightclub.
 Metin Akdülger as Orhan Şahin, the owner of the club.
 Suzan Kardeş, as Orhan's mother.
 Fırat Tanış as Çelebi, the manager of the club.
 Merve Şeyma Zengin as Tasula, the Turkish Greek friend of Raşel.
 Hülya Duyar, as İsmet's mother.
 İştar Gökseven as Ali Şeker, İsmet's father.
 Murat Garibağaoğlu as David.
 İlker Kılıç, as Mordo, fiancé of Raşel.
 Valeria Lakhina, as Diana, an Englishwoman working in the British embassy.
 Doğanay Ünal, as Bahtiyar.

Production 
The name of the series was first announced to be Kod Adı: Kulüp by Netflix in October 2020, along with the lead cast Gökçe Bahadır, Barış Arduç, and Salih Bademci. In the same month it was reported that Fırat Tanış will also be cast for the show. In March 2021 journalist Birsen Altuntaş tweeted Ruhi Sarı, Suzan Kardeş and Hazım Körmükçü will be starring as supporting characters in the series. The series was produced by Saner Ayar, Ayşe Durmaz and the Turkish media company O3 Medya for Netflix and directed by Seren Yüce and Zeynep Günay Tan. A team composed of Ayşin Akbulut, Serkan Yörük, Bengü Üçüncü, Rana Denizer and Necati Şahin (lead writer) was the writing team for the series.

Reception 
The reception of the Turkish Jewish community to the series was generally positive. The depiction of the Jewish rituals, Ladino language and political topics such as Varlık Vergisi was especially praised by the community members. Also the depiction of taboo topics such as Crypto Greeks, anti-Greek sentiment in Turkey, and Istanbul pogrom in 1955 (in part 2) was praised by the Greek Orthodox community members.

References

External links 
 
 

2020s Turkish television series
2021 Turkish television series debuts
2022 Turkish television series endings
Turkish drama television series
Turkish-language Netflix original programming
Judaeo-Spanish-language television shows
Television shows set in Istanbul
Television series produced in Istanbul
Television series set in 1955
Taxation in Turkey